Samuel Mbugua (born 1 January 1946) is a retired boxer from Kenya, who won the bronze medal in the lightweight division (– 60 kg) at the 1972 Summer Olympics in Munich, West Germany. In the semifinals he was defeated by Poland's eventual gold medalist Jan Szczepański (walk-over).

References
 databaseOlympics

External links
 https://www.nation.co.ke/kenya/sports/basketball/boxing-great-mbugua-walks-down-memory-lane-as-he-ages-gracefully-654702 

1946 births
Living people
Bantamweight boxers
Lightweight boxers
Boxers at the 1968 Summer Olympics
Boxers at the 1972 Summer Olympics
Olympic boxers of Kenya
Olympic bronze medalists for Kenya
Olympic medalists in boxing
Boxers at the 1970 British Commonwealth Games
Boxers at the 1974 British Commonwealth Games
Commonwealth Games silver medallists for Kenya
Commonwealth Games bronze medallists for Kenya
Kenyan male boxers
Medalists at the 1972 Summer Olympics
Commonwealth Games medallists in boxing
Medallists at the 1970 British Commonwealth Games
Medallists at the 1974 British Commonwealth Games